Francisco Sanches (also spelled Sánchez in contemporary sources; c. 1550 – November 16, 1623) was a skeptic, philosopher and physician of Sephardi Jewish origin, born in Tui, Spain (although he was baptized in Braga, Portugal).

Early life and academic career 
In the auditorium of the University of Toulouse there is a portrait of Francisco Sánchez, which bears the following inscription: "Francisco Sanchez Lusitanus". Although the investigations carried out by Henry Pierre Cazac at the beginning of the 20th century – he presented, among other documents, an autograph by Sánchez that reads as follows: "Ego, Franciscus Sanctius, Hispanus, natus in civitate Tudensi [...]" – showed the Spanish origin of Francisco Sánchez, there has been a long controversy around his nationality, as shown in the title of some publications that try to ascribe the name of the illustrious doctor and philosopher to the French Renaissance (The Skeptics of the French Renaissance, by John Owen) or Portuguese (Francisco Sanches ea dúvida methodica na Renascença portuguesa, doctoral thesis by Evaristo de Moraes Filho). His father was the Spaniard Antonio Sanches, also a physician; his mother Filipa de Sousa was Portuguese. Being of Jewish origin, even if converted, he was legally considered a New Christian.

He studied in Braga until the age of 12, when he moved to Bordeaux with his parents, fleeing the surveillance of the Portuguese Inquisition. There he resumed his studies at the College de Guyenne. He went on to study medicine in Rome in 1569, and, back in France, in Montpellier and Toulouse. He ended up, after 1575, as a professor of philosophy and medicine at the University of Toulouse.

Main work and thought 

In his Quod nihil scitur (That Nothing Is Known), written in 1576 and published in 1581, he used the classical skeptical arguments to show that science, in the Aristotelian sense of giving necessary reasons or causes for the behavior of nature, cannot be attained: the search for causes quickly descends into an infinite regress and so cannot give certitude. He also attacked demonstrations in the forms of syllogisms, arguing that the particular (the conclusion) is needed to have a conception of the general (the premises) and thus that syllogisms were circular and did not add to knowledge. 

Perfect knowledge, if attainable, is the intuitive apprehension of each individual thing. But, he then argued, even his own notion of science (perfect knowledge of an individual thing) is beyond human capabilities because of the nature of objects and the nature of man. The interrelation of objects, their unlimited number, and their ever-changing character prevent their being known. The limitations and variability of man's senses restrict him to knowledge of appearances, never of real substances. In forming these last argument he drew on his experience of Medicine to show how unreliable our sense experience is.

Sanches' first conclusion was the usual fideistic one of the time, that truth can be gained by faith. His second conclusion was to play an important role in later thought: just because nothing can be known in an ultimate sense, we should not abandon all attempts at knowledge but should try to gain what knowledge we can, namely, limited, imperfect knowledge of some of those things with which we become acquainted through observation, experience, and judgment. The realization that nihil scitur ("nothing is known") thus can yield some constructive results. This early formulation of "constructive" or "mitigated" skepticism was to be developed into an important explication of the new science by Marin Mersenne, Pierre Gassendi, and the leaders of the Royal Society.

Works 
Carmen de Cometa, 1577.
Quod nihil scitur, 1581.
De divinatione per somnum, ad Aristotelem, 1585.
Opera Medica, 1636, which includes:
De Longitudine et Brevitate vitae, liber
In lib. Aristotelis Physiognomicon, Commentarius
De Divinatione per Somnum
Quod Nihil Scitur, liber
Tractatus Philosophici, 1649.

Translations 
  – Latin-German. Introduction and Notes by Kaspar Howald. Translated by Damian Caluori and Kaspar Howald. Latin Text by Sergei Mariev. PhB 586. 2007.
 – Critical edition of Quod nihil scitur.
.
Sánchez, Francisco. 1991, Que nada se sabe. Introduction: Palacios, Fernando A. Spanish translation, Espasa Calpe, Madrid.ISBN 13: 9788423972357

Notes

Citations

References 
BRITO, Alberto Moreira da Rocha, Francisco Sanches, médico, professor e pedagogo. Braga: Bracara Augusta, 1952.
CALUORI, Damian, 'The Scepticism of Francisco Sanchez'. Archiv für Geschichte der Philosophie 89 (2007): 30–46 .
CARVALHO, Joaquim de, Introdução a Francisco Sanches, in Francisco Sanches, Opera Philosophica, Coimbra, 1955.
PÉREZ, Rolando. "Francisco Sanches". Stanford Encyclopedia of Philosophy . First published March 31, 2020.
PINTO, Sérgio da Silva, Braga et Francisco Sanches: discours prononcé à l'Université de Toulouse, à la séance solennele des commemorations du IVème centenaire de Francisco Sanches, le 12 Juin 1951, Braga: Cruz, 1951.
PINTO, Sérgio da Silva, Francisco Sanches, português, Braga: Bracara Augusta, 1952.
PINTO, Sérgio da Silva, Francisco Sanches, vida e obra, Braga 1952.
SÁ, Artur Moreira de, Raízes e projecção do pensamento de Francisco Sanches, Braga: University of Braga, 1955.
SÁ, Artur Moreira de, Francisco Sanches, Filósofo e Matemático, Lisboa, 1947.
SILVA, Lúcio Craveiro da, Actualidade de Francisco Sanches, Francisco Sanches Filósofo, and Francisco Sanches nas correntes do pensamento renascentino, in Ensaios de Filosofia e Cultura Portuguesa, Braga, 1994.
TAVARES, Severino, Lúcio Craveiro da SILVA, Diamantino MARTINS and Luís de PINA, Francisco Sanches, no IV centenário do seu nascimento, Braga: University of Braga, 1951.
VV.AA., Sanches au tournant de la pensée de la renaissance'', Sep. Colloque-L'humanisme portugais et l'Europe, Paris: Fondation Calouste Gulbenkian, Centre Culturel Portugais, 1984.

External links

1550s births
1623 deaths
Converts to Roman Catholicism from Judaism
Portuguese Renaissance writers
16th-century philosophers
17th-century philosophers
Jewish Portuguese writers
Portuguese Roman Catholics
Portuguese philosophers
People from Braga
16th-century Portuguese people
17th-century Portuguese people
16th-century Spanish philosophers
17th-century Spanish philosophers
Skeptics
College of Guienne alumni